Jassa is a genus of amphipods in the family Ischyroceridae, comprising the following species:

Jassa algensis (Nardo, 1847)
Jassa alonsoae Conlan, 1990
Jassa australis (Haswell, 1879)
Jassa barnardi Stephensen, 1949
Jassa borowskyae conlan, 1990
Jassa cadetta Krapp, Rampin & Libertini, 2008
Jassa calcaratus (Rathke, 1843)
Jassa californicus (Boeck, 1871)
Jassa carltoni Conlan, 1990
Jassa falcata (Montagu, 1808)
Jassa fenwicki Conlan, 1990
Jassa goniamera Walker, 1903
Jassa gruneri Conlan, 1990
Jassa hartmannae Conlan, 1990
Jassa herdmani (Walker, 1893)
Jassa ingens (Pfeffer, 1888)
Jassa justi Conlan, 1990
Jassa kjetilanna Vader & Krapp, 2005
Jassa marmorata Holmes, 1905
Jassa marmorea
Jassa monodon (Heller, 1867)
Jassa morinoi Conlan, 1990
Jassa multidentata Schellenberg, 1931
Jassa myersi Conlan, 1990
Jassa ocia (Bate, 1862)
Jassa oclairi Conlan, 1990
Jassa orientalis (Dana, 1852)
Jassa pusilla (Sars, 1894)
Jassa shawi Conlan, 1990
Jassa slatteryi Conlan, 1990
Jassa spinipes (Johnston, 1829)
Jassa staudei Conlan, 1990
Jassa thurstoni Conlan, 1990
Jassa validum (Dana, 1853)
Jassa variegatus Leach, 1814
Jassa wandeli Chevreux, 1906

References

Corophiidea